Imani Barker (born 13 August 2003) is a French professional football player who plays for Clermont II.

Club career 
He made his professional debut for Le Havre on the 15 May 2021, debuting as a right-back, during the Ligue 2 3-2 home win against the league champions of  ESTAC Troyes.

References

External links

2002 births
Sportspeople from Cayenne
French Guianan footballers
Living people
French footballers
Association football defenders
Le Havre AC players
Ligue 2 players
Championnat National 3 players